Weiningia is the name of an extinct genus of brachiopods.

See also

 List of brachiopod genera

References

Spiriferida
Prehistoric brachiopod genera
Cambrian first appearances